Cynotilapia axelrodi is a species haplochromine cichlid which is endemic to Lake Malawi where it occurs in Nkhata Bay and Chirombo Point, Malawi.

Etymology
The specific name honours the publisher Herbert R. Axelrod (1927-2017).

References

Fish of Malawi
Taxa named by Warren E. Burgess
axelrodi
Taxonomy articles created by Polbot
Fish described in 1976
Fish of Lake Malawi